Helpling (former names: Hassle.com and Teddle) is a Vauxhall, London-based online booking and payment platform that connects customers with pre-vetted local cleaners. In July 2015, the on-demand cleaning marketplace Helpling bought Hassle.com.  In June 2014, The Times listed Hassle.com as one of the top ten disruptive digital startups.

History 

Alex Depledge, Jules Coleman, and Tom Nimmo co-founded the company in March 2012. Teddle launched in Shoreditch in late 2012 with the aid of Techstars London (then known as Springboard), and various Angel Investors, before rebranding to Hassle and relocating to Vauxhall in 2013. The founders settled on the name Hassle for the company because they wanted to remove the hassle from people's lives so they could spend more time doing 'the things they love'. Hassle.com originally covered 27 service providers, such as personal trainers and driving instructors, before narrowing their focus to house cleaning at the end of 2012.

Founder of Hailo, Ron Zeghibe joined Hassle.com as non-executive chairman in April 2013.
In 2014, Hassle.com received $6M in series A funding from Facebook-backer Accel Partners. With the help of this new funding, Hassle.com has since expanded their services into Europe In October 2018,  Helpling received a “seven-figure” investment from Swiss media group Tamedia.

In July 2015, Helpling acquired Hassle.com  and in October 2018, Helpling, acquired the Swiss business of Book A Tiger, a German competitor.

Product 

Helpling is an online marketplace which matches working professionals with local pre-vetted home cleaners. Using their postcode, customers can search through local cleaner profiles to find the person who best suits their needs. The cleaners charge a flat rate of £10 per hour and pay a fee when they find a regular customer through the platform or 10% of the value of the booking for one time cleans.

Awards and recognition 

 Named Start-Up of the Year at Tech City News Elevator Awards in 2013

References 

Online marketplaces of the United Kingdom
Companies based in the London Borough of Lambeth
Business services companies established in 2012
2012 establishments in the United Kingdom